The 1962–63 NCAA men's ice hockey season began in November 1962 and concluded with the 1963 NCAA Division I Men's Ice Hockey Tournament's championship game on March 16, 1963 at the McHugh Forum in Chestnut Hill, Massachusetts. This was the 16th season in which an NCAA ice hockey championship was held and is the 69th year overall where an NCAA school fielded a team.

Regular season

Season tournaments

Standings

1963 NCAA Tournament

Note: * denotes overtime period(s)

Player stats

Scoring leaders
The following players led the league in points at the conclusion of the season.

GP = Games played; G = Goals; A = Assists; Pts = Points; PIM = Penalty minutes

Leading goaltenders
The following goaltenders led the league in goals against average at the end of the regular season while playing at least 33% of their team's total minutes.

GP = Games played; Min = Minutes played; W = Wins; L = Losses; OT = Overtime/shootout losses; GA = Goals against; SO = Shutouts; SV% = Save percentage; GAA = Goals against average

Awards

NCAA

WCHA

ECAC

References

External links
College Hockey Historical Archives
1962–63 NCAA Standings

 
NCAA